Storm, in comics, may refer to:

 Storm (Marvel Comics), a member of Marvel Comics' X-Men, also known as Ororo Munroe
 Storm (Don Lawrence), a Dutch science-fiction comic series and its protagonist
 Storm, a family in Marvel Comics, largely appearing in the Fantastic Four titles:
 Susan Storm, also known as the Invisible Woman
 Johnny Storm, also known as the Human Torch
 Franklin Storm, their father
 Mary Storm, their mother who died, but is a character in Ultimate Fantastic Four
 Storm the Albatross, a character in the Sonic the Hedgehog franchise video games and comics
 Storm Boy, a DC Comics character associated with the Legion of Super-Heroes
 Storm Curtis, a character who appeared in Prize Comics
 Captain William Storm, a DC Comics character who appeared in his own eponymous title Capt. Storm and was a member of the original Losers

See also
Storm (disambiguation)
Stormbreaker: The Graphic Novel, the first of a series of graphic novels based on the book and film
Stormfront, a character from The Boys
Stormquest, a title from Caliber Comics
Storm Shadow (G.I. Joe), a character from the G.I. Joe comics, who has his own eponymous series
Stormwatch (comics), a Wildstorm title
Stormwatcher, a comic from Eclipse Comics

References